Charavali is a rural locality (a selo) in Novokulinsky Selsoviet, Novolaksky District, Republic of Dagestan, Russia. The population was 1,214 as of 2010. There are 6 streets.

Geography 
Charavali is located 6 km northeast of Novolakskoye (the district's administrative centre) by road, on the bank of the Yaryk-su River. Novokuli and Zoriotar are the nearest rural localities.

Nationalities 
Chechens and Laks live there.

References 

Rural localities in Novolaksky District